Schönhausen (Elbe) is a railway station located in Schönhausen, Germany. The station is located on the Berlin-Lehrte Railway. The train services are operated by Hanseatische Eisenbahn.

Train services
The station is serves by the following service(s):

Local services  Stendal - Rathenow

References

Railway stations in Saxony-Anhalt